Cuba has suffered from widespread and rampant corruption since the establishment of the Republic of Cuba in 1902. The book Corruption in Cuba states that public ownership resulted in "a lack of identifiable ownership and widespread misuse and theft of state resources... when given opportunity, few citizens hesitate to steal from the government." Furthermore, the complex relationship between governmental and economic institutions makes them especially "prone to corruption."

The question of what causes corruption in Cuba presently and historically continues to be discussed and debated by scholars. Jules R. Benjamin suggests that Cuba's corrupt politics were a product of the colonial heritage of Cuban politics and the financial aid provided by the United States that favoured international sugar prices in the late 19th and early 20th centuries. Following the Second World War, the level of corruption in Cuba, among many other Latin American and Caribbean countries, was said to have risen significantly. Some scholars, such as Eduardo Sáenz Rovner, attribute this to North America's increased involvement in Cuba after the First World War that isolated Cuban workers. Cubans were excluded from a large sector of the economy and unable to participate in managerial roles that were taken over by United States employers. Along similar lines, Louis A. Pérez has written that “World War Two created new opportunities for Cuban economic development, few of which, however, were fully realized. Funds were used irrationally. Corruption and graft increased and contributed in no small part to missed opportunities, but so did mismanagement and miscalculation.”

Transparency International's 2021 Corruption Perceptions Index gave Cuba a score of 46/100, where 0 indicates that a country is very corrupt and 100 indicates that it is very clean.  When ranked by score, Cuba ranked 64th out of 180 countries in the Index, where the country ranked 1st is perceived to have the most honest public sector.

History

Pre-Revolution 
For more information: Republic of Cuba (1902-1959)

The Republic of Cuba at the turn of the 20th Century was largely characterized by a deeply ingrained tradition of corruption where political participation resulted in opportunities for elites to engage in opportunities for wealth accumulation. Cuba's first presidential period under Don Tomas Estrada Palma from 1902 to 1906 was considered to uphold the best standards of administrative integrity in the history of the Republic of Cuba. However, a United States intervention in 1906 resulted in Charles Edward Magoon, an American diplomat, taking over the government until 1909. It has been debated whether Magoon's government condoned or in fact engaged in corrupt practices. Hugh Thomas suggests that while Magoon disapproved of corrupt practices, corruption still persisted under his administration and he undermined the autonomy of the judiciary and their court decisions. Cuba's subsequent president, Jose Miguel Gomez, was the first to become involved in pervasive corruption and government corruption scandals. These scandals involved bribes that were allegedly paid to Cuban officials and legislators under a contract to search the Havana harbour, as well as the payment of fees to government associates and high-level officials. Gomez's successor, Mario Garcia Menocal, wanted to put an end to the corruption scandals and claimed to be committed to administrative integrity as he ran on a slogan of "honesty, peace and work." Despite his intentions, corruption actually intensified under his government from 1913-1921. Instances of fraud became more common while private actors and contractors frequently colluded with public officials and legislators. Charles Edward Chapman attributes the increase of corruption to the sugar boom that occurred in Cuba under the Menocal administration. Furthermore, the emergence of World War One enabled the Cuban government to manipulate sugar prices, the sales of exports and import permits.

Alfredo Zayas succeeded Menocal from 1921–25 and engaged in what Calixto Maso refers to as the most "maximum expression of administrative corruption." Both petty and grand corruption spread to nearly all aspects of public life and the Cuban administration became largely characterized by nepotism as Zayas relied on friends and relatives to illegally gain greater access to wealth. Due to Zaya's previous policies, Gerardo Machado aimed to diminish corruption and improve the public sector's performance under his successive administration from 1925-1933. While he was successfully able to reduce the amounts of low level and petty corruption, grand corruption still largely persisted. Machado embarked on development projects that enabled the persistence of grand corruption through inflated costs and the creation of "large margins" that enabled public officials to appropriate money illegally. Under his government, opportunities for corruption became concentrated into fewer hands with "centralized government purchasing procedures" and the collection of bribes among a smaller number of bureaucrats and administrators. Through the development of real estate infrastructures and the growth of Cuba's tourism industry, Machado's administration was able to use insider information to profit from private sector business deals.

Argote-Freyre points out that Cuba's population under the Republic had a high tolerance for corruption. Furthermore, Cubans knew and criticized who was corrupt, but admired them for their ability to act as "criminals with impunity." Corrupt officials went beyond members of congress to also include military officials who granted favours to residents and accepted bribes. The establishment of an illegal gambling network within the military enabled army personnel such as Lieutenant Colonel Pedraza and Major Mariné to engage in extensive illegal gambling activities. Mauricio Augusto Font and Alfonso Quiroz, authors of The Cuban Republic and José Martí, say that corruption pervaded in public life under the administrations of Presidents Ramón Grau and Carlos Prío Socarrás. Prío was reported to have stolen over $90 million in public funds, which was equivalent to one fourth of the annual national budget. Senator Eduardo Chibás dedicated himself to exposing corruption in the Cuban government, and formed the Partido Ortodoxo in 1947 to further this aim.

Prior to the Communist revolution, Cuba was ruled under the elected government of Fulgencio Batista from 1940-1944. Throughout this time period, Batista's support base consisted mainly of corrupt politicians and military officials. Batista himself was able to heavily profit from the regime before coming into power through inflated government contracts and gambling proceeds. In 1942, the British Foreign Office reported that the U.S. State Department was "very worried" about corruption under President Fulgencio Batista, describing the problem as "endemic" and exceeding "anything which had gone on previously." British diplomats believed that corruption was rooted within Cuba's most powerful institutions, with the highest individuals in government and military being heavily involved in gambling and the drug trade. In terms of civil society, Eduardo Saenz Rovner writes that corruption within the Police and government enabled the expansion of criminal organizations in Cuba. Batista refused U.S. President Franklin Roosevelt's offer to send experts to help reform the Cuban Civil Service.

Later in 1952, Batista led a U-S backed military coup against Prío Socarrás and ruled until 1959. Under his rule, Batista led a corrupt dictatorship that involved close links with organized crime organizations and the reduction of civil freedoms of Cubans. This period resulted in Bastista engaging in more "sophisticated practices of corruption" at both the administrative and civil society levels. Batista and his administration engaged in profiteering from the lottery as well as illegal gambling. Corruption further flourished in civil society through increasing amounts of police corruption, censorship of the press as well as media, and creating anti-communist campaigns that suppressed opposition with violence, torture and public executions. The former culture of toleration and acceptance towards corruption also dissolved with the dictatorship of Batista. For instance, one citizen wrote that "however corrupt Grau and Prío were, we elected them and therefore allowed them to steal from us. Batista robs us without our permission.” Corruption under Batista further expanded into the economic sector with alliances that he forged with foreign investors and the prevalence of illegal casinos and criminal organizations in the country's capital of Havana.

Post-Revolution 
For more information: Cuban Revolution

Corruption in the Batista government has been cited as a key factor that led to his overthrow in 1959. Despite the United States' initial support of Batista, John F. Kennedy stated in 1961 that,"The character of the Batista regime in Cuba made a violent popular reaction almost inevitable. The rapacity of the leadership, the corruption of the government, the brutality of the police, the regime's indifference to the needs of the people for education, medical care, housing, for social justice and economic opportunity-all these, in Cuba as elsewhere, constituted an open invitation to revolution."Once the Communist Party of Cuba took control of the government, Fidel Castro immediately began to eliminate all remnants of the former batistiano system that was seen as highly corrupt. This involved executing several dozen batistianos and calling for the confiscation of wealth of corrupt officials among other actions. In 1959, Fidel Castro issued a series of law decrees that enabled the confiscation of private property in addition to funds that were previously controlled by Batista and his collaborators. The Cuban government thus transformed from a corrupt military dictatorship to a single-party socialist state.

Despite their efforts to rid Cuba of any former corruption that persisted under Batista, Sergio Diaz-Briquets and Jorge F. Pérez-López, in the book Corruption in Cuba, argue that the government of Fidel and Raul Castro institutionalized corruption with government monopolies, cronyism, and lack of accountability. Moreover, Daniel Erikson writes that Castro's control of economic resources transformed Cuba into "the most captured state in Latin America" and suggests that corruption might have increased, rather than decreased after the Cuban Revolution. While the state has no toleration for political or economic opposition to the government, a system of special advantages evolved for high-ranking members of the Cuban nomenklatura and the military as they were able to enjoy privileges that were unavailable to ordinary citizens. The nomenklatura, a term adopted by the former Soviet Union, referred to list of key positions and appointments within the government made by the Communist Party. This privileged group of political elites were particularly subject to corruption due to their access to state resources. As such, the nomenklatura were able to benefit from certain privileges that are not available to the general public including, but not limited to, being exempt from the rationing system, obtaining imported foods and consumer goods, gaining access to better housing as well as special hospitals and medications, and having the ability to travel abroad. The Cuban nomenklatura were also referred to as pinchos, pinchos grandes or mayimbes.

Cuba's Socialist Economy and Corruption 
By 1968, the Cuban state had nationalized 100% of the industry, construction, transportation, retail trade, wholesale and foreign trade, banking and education. By 1988, they further controlled 92% of the state's agriculture. As a result of their large share of ownership, measuring corruption in Cuba proves to be difficult. Citizens have limited possibilities to appeal against arbitrary or take actions against instances of unjust government action. However, as Pérez-López writes, there is some available information on Cuba's corrupt activities regarding former black market operations, the misuse of office and presence of the Cuban nomenklatura. Other forms of corrupt behaviour such as paying bribes were likely present, but are much more difficult to measure. Professor Esteban Morales Domínguez also states that the illegal market in Cuba's economy was able to emerge due to "large imbalances between supply and demand" that result in "hidden leaders" offering alternatives to state resources and services.

On a micro-level, corruption under the socialist economy involved ordinary citizens engaging in acts of petty corruption in everyday life. Díaz-Briquets and Pérez-López have argued that the socialist economy resulted in the rise of social attitudes that condone taking advantage of inequalities in income and assets for personal benefit. This was mainly developed through the confiscation of private assets and expropriation of personal property. As a result, they suggest that the scarcity of goods and services resulted in the widespread prevalence of petty corruption and crimes. On the other hand, Mark Kruger states that Cuba has had one of the lowest crime rates in Latin America and the Caribbean, specifically referencing the low rates of domestic violence and violence against women. Nonetheless, theft from the state sector became the main source of resources and products that entered the black market in Cuba. One Cuban attorney from a cigar factory described the petty theft issue as individuals "faced with shortages of food and basic consumer-products, workers steal from the workplaces where something is made in order to ease their needs." Other instances of documented theft included stealing bottles of rum, beer, slaughtering stolen cattle, stealing cigarette papers, and more.

From a government standpoint, public officials in Cuba largely engaged in corrupt practices through the diversion of state resources for personal gains and taking bribes in return for discussing benefits. For example, one scandal broke out in which a manager of the Antonio Guiteras sugar mill had used construction materials to build his own personal pig pen outside of his home. Through a centrally planned economy, the lack of independent civil society organizations and a government controlled press, Klitgaard suggests that this created the perfect conditions under a socialist society for which corruption could flourish. Cuban government officials were able to enjoy privileges possessed by few others along with a low degree of accountability for their actions and control over the supply of goods and services.

In the 1990s, corruption changed its form and visibility due to the changing economic structures that enabled more space for the private sector. Jorge Dominguez thus writes that the marketization of the economy in the 1990s contributed to corruption through the "interaction of state and economy" despite its limited nature. New opportunities for corruption were created due to the lack of legal institutions and property rights to account for the transitioning economy. The new economic system of the 1990s in Cuba included new, limited opportunities for self-employment in newly private industries such as restaurants. However, due to the scarcity of these jobs, a large proportion of the Cuban population resorted to working in the black market and underground economy. Cuban citizens further depended on black markets for access to basic resources that exhibit high costs under state-led businesses.

Sociolismo

Sociolismo is the informal term used in Cuba to describe the reciprocal exchange of favours by individuals, usually relating to circumventing bureaucratic restrictions or obtaining hard-to-find goods. Ramón de la Cruz Ochoa, Cuba's General Prosecutor of the Republic, stated that he viewed sociolismo as one of the main corruption problems in Cuba. This system involves rewarding friends and family of government officials and generally results in individuals disregarding the rule of law. Gary Marx wrote that "in cash-poor Cuba, connections are as good as currency" and thus the system of sociolismo is able to flourish. Furthermore, sociolismo expanded into daily life as it involved maintaining relationships with individuals that had access to resources. Personal ties are used in Cuba in nearly every aspect of daily life, from receiving extra food that is rationed by the government to securing spaces in schools for children. In relation to sociolismo, Fernández also uses the term lo informal to refer to the behavioural patterns involving likability (simpatia), familiarity that leads to trust (confianza), and being a nice person (ser buena gente) that serve create informal networks and bypass legal norms. In turn, participation in lo informal results in individuals engaging in a "culture of illegality" and becoming accustomed to breaking the law. In terms of the word's origin, it is derived from the Spanish word socio which means business partner or buddy, and is a pun on socialismo, the Spanish term for socialism. It is analogous to the blat of the Soviet Union.

Cuba in the 21st Century: Combatting Corruption 
Erikson identifies the control of corruption as one of the main obstacles that Cuba must overcome in order to transition successfully away from authoritarian rule to democracy. The Cuba Transition Project (CTP) has aimed to propose anti-corruption policies as an important component of a greater transition strategy for Cuba. In 2001, the Cuban Government set up a Ministry for Auditing and Control to investigate corruption and improve efficiency in the Cuban economy. However, Lopez and Diaz-Briquets have pointed out that this system relies upon transparency and accountability in order to function, which is lacking in Cuba through their tendencies to hide budgetary and financial information. A BBC News article stated that foreign businessmen in Cuba said levels of corruption were lower than in most other countries in Latin America. BBC says that "Inspectors went to thousands of state-run enterprises and consistently found customers being short-changed. The offences included beer mugs being only partially filled, taxi rides being charged at almost five times the going rate, government price lists being hidden, even shoe repairers charging vastly inflated rates."

Fidel Castro announced in 2005 his new efforts to root out cases of corruption and avoid maldistribution of government goods and services. This included a major housing initiative that involved the participation of local governments and citizens as a strategy to prevent corrupt practices and maximize the benefits of the housing program. Castro later promised in the same year to embark on a battle against theft, immoral conduct and misuse of government resources. After Raúl Castro took power in 2006, over 10 corruption scandals have been uncovered and several public servants were arrested. In 2008, Raúl Castro's government led additional initiatives to crack down on possible corruption cases through auditing and inspections. This led to the conviction of Rogelio Acevedo who had leased Cuba's airline's planes and was found with millions of dollars worth of cash in his home. Raúl Castro later created the Office of the Comptroller General to fight corruption after stating that corruption risked destroying Cuba's "values and morality and it corrodes our institutions." Among other convictions, high-level employees from the Tourist Agency Sol y Son as well as the food company Río Zaza were arrested for fraud and bribery. Both companies were said to have had ties to a previously arrested corrupt businessman and close friend of Fidel Castro.

See also
 International Anti-Corruption Academy
 Group of States Against Corruption
 International Anti-Corruption Day
 ISO 37001 Anti-bribery management systems
 United Nations Convention against Corruption
 OECD Anti-Bribery Convention
 Transparency International

References

 
Government of Cuba
Economy of Cuba
Cuba